Systems and Synthetic Biology is a peer-reviewed scientific journal covering systems and synthetic biology. It was established in 2007 and was published by Springer Science+Business Media. The editors-in-chief were Pawan K. Dhar (University of Kerala) and Ron Weiss (Massachusetts Institute of Technology). The journal's last volume was in 2015.

Abstracting and indexing 
The journal is abstracted and indexed in:

References

External links 
 

Molecular and cellular biology journals
Systems biology
Synthetic biology
English-language journals
Hybrid open access journals
Quarterly journals
Publications established in 2007
Springer Science+Business Media academic journals